The 1874 Stroud by-election was fought on 6 January 1874[20 2].  The byelection was fought due to the Death of the incumbent MP of the Liberal Party, Henry Selfe Page Winterbotham.  It was won by the Conservative candidate John Edward Dorington.

References

1874 in England
1874 elections in the United Kingdom
Stroud District
By-elections to the Parliament of the United Kingdom in Gloucestershire constituencies
19th century in Gloucestershire